Katnarpara is one of the largest regions (para in Bengali) of Bogra in Bangladesh.

Demographics
According to the 2011 Bangladesh census, the population of the village was 7,174.

Region
Katnarpara is under ward no. 3 of Bogra municipal corporation. Sub-regions of this region are Shibbati, Kalitola, Ali-Sonar Lane, Cotton-Mill, Dottobari, Borogola, Namajgor, etc. It covers almost five square kilometers.

Economy
Two factories make bread: Lucky bread factory and Shimu Bakery.

Education
Coronation is a large school that has operated for 150 years. There is another high school. Three primary schools are in the area.

Mosques and temples
Five mosques & three temples are located there. Two graveyards, Namajgor Gorosthan and Dottobari Smoshan and a funeral parlor are there.

References

Bogura District